Baccalà all'abruzzese is a traditional dish from Abruzzo; it is made of cod and potatoes, tomatoes, oil, garlic, parsley, onion, red pepper, salt, and black olives.

See also
 Cuisine of Abruzzo
 List of fish dishes

References

External links
Baccalà all'abruzzese | Regione Abruzzo | Dipartimento Sviluppo Economico - Turismo

Italian seafood dishes
Cuisine of Abruzzo